Virgin Money is a financial services brand used by two independent brand-licensees worldwide from the Virgin Group. Virgin Money branded services are currently available in Australia and the United Kingdom. The brand formerly operated in South Africa and the United States.

Each Virgin Money branded entity acts independently from the others, thus the products vary from country to country.

Current brand licensees

Virgin Money Australia

Virgin Money currently has operations in Australia with 150,000 customers and is owned by Bank of Queensland.

Virgin Money UK

Virgin Money currently has operations in the United Kingdom, the company was initially established as a personal finance company under the name of Virgin Direct in 1995, and the Virgin Money brand itself was introduced in 2000. Virgin Money vastly increased its size and customer base in 2012 with the purchase of the so-called 'good bank' portion of the nationalised Northern Rock bank.

In 2018, the entire UK operation of Virgin Money was sold to CYBG plc in a £1.7bn all-share deal which made the group the sixth-largest bank in the UK. On 31 October 2019 CYGB plc changed its name to Virgin Money UK plc.

In September 2021, announced the closure of 31 branches and elimination of 112 jobs across Scotland and the north of England "as it adapts to changing customer demand".

Former brand licensees

Virgin Money South Africa

Virgin Money had operations in South Africa. In 2006, Virgin Money South Africa launched with a credit card initially in a partnership with ABSA worth $33 million.

In August 2020, it was announced that the company would be rebranding to Spot Money.

Virgin Money US

In 2007, Virgin Money launched in the US after the Virgin Group made a majority stake investment in CircleLending, a company that facilitated peer-to-peer loans. Virgin Money USA entered into dissolution on 1 November 2010, and is no longer listed as a Virgin property on the Virgin Money home page; the Virgin Money US site itself was also dismantled. Virgin Money subsequently withdrew entirely from the US market and its social lending servicing was transferred to its servicing partner, Graystone Solutions, which continues to service the social loans under its own brand.

Corporate identity

Virgin Money's logo is focused around the main logo of Virgin Group, which is an underlined word 'Virgin' in a red and magenta gradient coloured circle. This logo was introduced in January 2012 to signify the purchase of Northern Rock, which used a magenta logo. Some versions of the logo use a plain red circle, such as the variant used frequently in South Africa.

Virgin Money's older logo was the word 'Virgin' in a red rounded skew rectangle, similar in shape to a credit card, followed by the word 'Money'. This logo remains in use in South Africa. The previous logo had used a red logo with the word 'Virgin' in a large circle and three smaller circles above the word 'Money'. Virgin Direct's logo had been a more simplistic rendering of the company name, in white on top of a red rectangle with a semicircle attached on the left side.

References

External links

Virgin Money Australia
Virgin Money UK

 
1995 establishments in the United Kingdom
British companies established in 1995
Banks established in 1995
Peer-to-peer lending companies